Captain Jeremiah O'Brien (1744–1818) was an Irish-American captain in the Massachusetts State Navy.  Prior to its existence (or that of the Continental Navy), he commanded the sloop Unity when he captured the British armed schooner  in the Battle of Machias, the first naval battle of the American Revolutionary War. He also led the first American attack on Nova Scotia in the Raid on St. John (1775). Six United States ships were named in his honor.

Early life
Jeremiah was the eldest son of Irish immigrants Morris and Mary O'Brien. He was born in Kittery, District of Maine in 1744. His family moved to Scarborough, Maine and settled in Machias, Maine in the 1760s to engage in lumbering. Maine was a part of Massachusetts at the time.

American Revolution
Reports of the battles of Lexington and Concord reached Machias in early May 1775, leading Benjamin Foster to rally Machias residents at Job Burnham's tavern. Machias merchant captain Ichabod Jones sailed his ships Unity and Polly to Boston with a cargo of lumber and purchased food for sale in Machias. British troops encouraged Jones to deliver another cargo of lumber for construction of their barracks in Boston. Admiral Samuel Graves ordered HMS Margaretta, under the command of James Moore, to accompany Jones' ships to discourage interference from Machias rebels. When the ships reached Machias on 2 June 1775, James Moore ordered the liberty pole removed; and Machias townspeople refused to load the lumber. Foster plotted to capture the British officers when they attended church on 11 June, but the British avoided capture and retreated downriver aboard Margaretta. On 12 June Foster pursued Margaretta aboard the packet boat Falmouth. After Falmouth ran aground, O'Brien and his five brothers, Gideon, John, William, Dennis and Joseph, seized the Unity.

Under the command of Jeremiah O'Brien, thirty-one townsmen sailed aboard Unity armed with guns, swords, axes, and pitch forks and captured Margaretta in an hour-long battle after Margaretta had threatened to bombard the town. John O'Brien jumped aboard Margaretta as the two ships closed, but was forced to jump overboard by the British crew. After rescuing John, Unity again closed Margaretta until their rigging became entangled. Unity was bombarded by grenades from the British ship, but Margaretta surrendered after James Moore was mortally wounded.

This battle is often considered the first time British colors were struck to those of the United States, even though the Continental Navy did not exist at the time. The United States Merchant Marine claims Unity as its member and this incident as their beginning.

In August 1775, O'Brien participated in the Raid on St. John (1775).

O'Brien continued as the captain of Unity, renamed Machias Liberty, for two years, and received the first captain's commission in the Massachusetts State Navy in 1775.

Later life
President James Madison appointed O'Brien as the federal customs collector for the port of Machias in 1811, and he held the position until his death in 1818.

Honors
 Five ships in the United States Navy have been named in his honor:
 , a torpedo boat, built in 1900 and served until 1909
 , an O'Brien-class destroyer, which served from 1915 until 1922
 , an EC2-S-C1-class Liberty ship, which served during World War II from 1943 until 1946 and is currently an operational museum ship in San Francisco
 Bangor and Aroostook Railroad bicentennial locomotive number 1776 was named Jeremiah O'Brien

See also
 Irish military diaspora

References

Notes

1744 births
1818 deaths
United States Navy officers
American sailors
American people of Irish descent
Maine in the American Revolution
People from Kittery, Maine
People from Machias, Maine